The Electoral district of Longford was a single-member electoral district of the Tasmanian House of Assembly. It centred on the town of Longford near Tasmania's second city, Launceston.

The seat was created in a redistribution ahead of the 1886 election, largely replacing the seat of Norfolk Plains, and was abolished when the Tasmanian parliament adopted the Hare-Clark electoral model in 1909.

Members for Longford

References
 
 
 Parliament of Tasmania (2006). The Parliament of Tasmania from 1956

Longford